The Canons Regular of the New Jerusalem is a public association of the faithful in the Catholic Church, founded in 2002 in the Diocese of La Crosse, Wisconsin,  and currently located in Charles Town, West Virginia after a period in Chesterfield, Missouri in the Archdiocese of Saint Louis, in the United States. The group operates under the authority of Bishop Mark E. Brennan, the diocesan bishop of the Diocese of Wheeling-Charleston.

Description
The institute was founded by then-Bishop (later Cardinal) Raymond Leo Burke and Dom Daniel Augustine Oppenheimer, Prior.

This institute celebrates the traditional Latin Liturgy (Tridentine Mass) according to the rites of 1962, as promulgated by Pope John Paul II's motu proprio Ecclesia Dei of 1988.  The members live in community under the Augustinian Rule, taking vows of stability, conversion of life, obedience, and common life.

See also 
 Canons Regular
 Rule of St. Augustine
 List of communities using the Tridentine Mass

References

External links 
 Canons Regular of the New Jerusalem – Official site

Institutes of consecrated life
Ecclesia Dei
Canons regular
Catholic Church in Missouri
Catholic Church in Wisconsin
Christian organizations established in 2002
21st-century Christian monasteries
2002 establishments in Wisconsin
Communities using the Tridentine Mass